American singer Katy Perry has released six studio albums as well as an acoustic album and two live albums since her debut in 2001. This has resulted in four concert tours (all of them worldwide), and a lot of TV and award shows performances. In 2001 she released her first studio album Katy Hudson under her real name Katy Hudson, which is only Christian music album. Since adopting the stage name Katy Perry, she has been promoting all of her albums, starting with her second album One of the Boys in 2008 and 2009, through performances at several festivals including the Jingle Ball and the MTV Video Music Awards.

In 2009 she embarked on her debut headlining concert tour, Hello Katy Tour, which visited North America, Europe, Asia and Oceania and grossed over $1.5 million from 89 shows. Perry released her first extended play/live album, MTV Unplugged, in collaboration with MTV that November. She embarked on her second world tour California Dreams Tour in 2011 to promote her third studio album Teenage Dream. The tour visited Europe, Oceania, Asia, North America and South America. The tour became an international success, with tickets selling out and ranking 16th in Pollstar's "2011 Top 25 Worldwide Tours", earning over $59.5 million. At the end of 2011, Billboard ranked it #13 on its annual "Top 25 Tours", earning nearly $48.9 million and won the Favorite Headliner Tour Award at the 38th People's Choice Awards. In July 2012 she released her first documentary theatre movie Katy Perry: Part of Me which included footage from the California Dreams Tour.

Perry's next tour was named the Prismatic World Tour which began in May 2014 and ended in October 2015 visiting Europe, North America, Oceania, Asia and South America. The tour supported her fourth studio album Prism which was released in October 2013. The tour grossed more than $204.3 million from 151 shows with a total attendance of 1,984,503 between 2014 and 2015 becoming Perry's longest, most attended, highest grossing and most successful tour to date. The Sydney November 28 concert was recorded for her second live album: The Prismatic World Tour Live which was released in October 2015, two weeks after the tour ended in Costa Rica.

In July 2016, the singer released "Rise" the official song for the 2016 Summer Olympics. A year later she released her fifth studio album Witness (2017), which's homonymous track got leaked in May 2016. The album was released in June 2017. To accompany the album's release, the singer broadcast herself for four days on YouTube with a four-day live-stream titled Katy Perry Live: Witness World Wide. Three months later, Witness: The Tour began in Montreal after some dates were either cancelled or reshudeled "due to production issues". At the end of 2017, the tour placed at number 77 on Pollstars "2017 Year-End Top 100 Worldwide Tours" list, estimating that it grossed $28.1 million and that 266,300 people attended throughout the year. In July 2018, Pollstar ranked the tour on #14 at the Mid Year Top 100 Worldwide Tours 2018 with $48.8 million and 577,617 of tickets sold in 54 shows. The tour grossed more than $124.2 million and it became Perry's second most successful tour to date.

In May 2021, Perry announced her first Las Vegas residency, Play showing at the Theatre at Resorts World Las Vegas with dates through December 29, 2021 to January 15, 2022. Eight more shows were added later that month in response to popular demand, extending the residency to March 19, 2022. “Play” opened to a sold-out crowd at the 5,000-capacity theatre, with the furthest seat on being only 150 feet from the stage. The singer announced in January 2022 that she had added 16 more shows for May 27 through August 13 of that year. Before adding an additional eight shows for October 2022 due to high demand.

 Concert tours 
{| class="wikitable sortable plainrowheaders" style="text-align:center;" width="100%"
! scope="col" |Title
! scope="col" width="14%" |Dates
! scope="col" |Associated album(s)
! scope="col" |Continent(s)
! scope="col" |Shows
! scope="col" |Gross
! scope="col" |Attendance
! scope="col" width="2%" class="unsortable" |
|-
! scope="row" |Hello Katy Tour
| – November 28, 2009
|One of the Boys
| North AmericaEuropeAsiaOceania
|89
|$1,500,000
|69,577
|
|- class="expand-child"
| colspan="8" style="border-bottom-width:3px; padding:5px;" |

|-
! scope="row" |California Dreams Tour
| – January 22, 2012
|Teenage Dream
|EuropeOceaniaAsiaNorth AmericaLatin America
|124
|$59,500,000
|1,069,921
|
|- class="expand-child"
| colspan="8" style="border-bottom-width:3px; padding:5px;" |
{{hidden|headercss=font-size: 100%; width: 95%;|contentcss=text-align: left; font-size: 100%; width: 95%;|header= California Dreams Tour setlist|content=
 "Teenage Dream"
 "Hummingbird Heartbeat"
 "Waking Up in Vegas"
 "Ur So Gay"
 "Peacock"
 "I Kissed a Girl"
 "Circle the Drain"
 "E.T."
 "Who Am I Living For?"
 "Pearl"
 "Not Like the Movies"
 "Only Girl (In the World)" / "Big Pimpin'" / "Friday" / "Whip My Hair"
 "Thinking of You"
 "Hot n Cold"
 "Last Friday Night (T.G.I.F.)"
 "I Wanna Dance with Somebody (Who Loves Me)" 
 "Firework"Encore:'
 "California Gurls"
}}
|-
! scope="row" |Prismatic World Tour
| – October 18, 2015
|Prism
|EuropeNorth AmericaOceaniaAsiaLatin America
|151
|$204,300,000
|1,984,503
|
|- class="expand-child"
| colspan="8" style="border-bottom-width:3px; padding:5px;" |
{{hidden|headercss=font-size: 100%; width: 95%;|contentcss=text-align: left; font-size: 100%; width: 95%;|header= Prismatic World Tour setlist|content=
 "Roar"
 "Part of Me"
 "Wide Awake"
 "This Moment" / "Love Me"
 "Dark Horse"
 "E.T."
 "Legendary Lovers"
 "I Kissed a Girl"
 "Hot n Cold"
 "International Smile" / "Vogue"
"By the Grace of God"
 "The One That Got Away" / "Thinking of You"
"Unconditionally"
 "Walking on Air"
 "It Takes Two"
 "This Is How We Do" / "Last Friday Night (T.G.I.F.)"
"Teenage Dream"
 "California Gurls"
 "Birthday"
Encore
 "Firework"
}}
|-
! scope="row" |Witness: The Tour
|September 19, 2017 – August 21, 2018
|Witness
|North AmericaLatin AmericaAsiaEuropeAfricaOceania
|115
|$124,200,000
|1.134,917
|
|- class="expand-child"
| colspan="8" style="border-bottom-width:3px; padding:5px;" |
{{hidden|headercss=font-size: 100%; width: 95%;|contentcss=text-align: left; font-size: 100%; width: 95%;|header= Witness: The Tour setlist|content=
"Witness"
"Roulette"
"Dark Horse"
"Chained to the Rhythm"
"Teenage Dream" 
"Hot n Cold"
"Last Friday Night (T.G.I.F.)" 
"California Gurls"
"I Kissed a Girl"
"Déjà Vu"
"Tsunami"
"E.T."
"Bon Appétit" 
"Wide Awake"
"Thinking of You"
"Power"
"Part of Me"
"Swish Swish"
"Roar"
Encore
"Firework"
}}
|}

Concert residencies 
{| class="wikitable sortable plainrowheaders" style="text-align:center;" width="100%"
! scope="col" |Title
! scope="col" width="14%" |Dates
! scope="col" width="2%" class="unsortable" |
|-
! scope="row" |Play
| – August 27, 2023
|- class="expand-child"
| colspan="8" style="border-bottom-width:3px; padding:5px;" |
{{hidden|headercss=font-size: 100%; width: 95%;|contentcss=text-align: left; font-size: 100%; width: 95%;|header=Play setlist|content=
”E.T.”
”Chained to the Rhythm”
”Dark Horse”
”Not the End of the World”
”California Gurls”
”Hot n Cold”
”Last Friday Night (T.G.I.F)”
”Waking Up in Vegas”
”Bon Appetit”
”Daisies”
”I Kissed a Girl”
”Lost”
”Part of Me”
”Wide Awake”
”Never Really Over”
”Swish Swish”
”When I'm Gone”
”Walking on Air”
”Teenage Dream”
”Smile”
”Roar”
Encore
"Firework"
}}
|}

Live performances

One of the Boys era

Teenage Dream era

Prism era

Witness era

Smile era

References 

Live performances
Katy Perry